Danna Paola is the self-titled extended play by Mexican actress and singer, Danna Paola. Released in September 2007 by Universal Music, the EP includes only five tracks. The songs were especially written for Paola who, at the time, was entering adolescence. The authors are Pambo, Liquits and Xabi San Martín, from La Oreja de Van Gogh.

Track list 
 "Es mejor" – 3:04
 "Dame corazón" – 3:26
 "Mundo de caramelo" – 3:53
 "El primer día sin ti" – 3:54
 "De aquí para allá" – 3:32

References

External links
Danna Paola (EP) on Allmusic

2007 EPs
Danna Paola albums